Baunreaghcong is a mountain in Laois, Ireland.

Geography 
Baunreaghcong is the third-highest mountain in the Slieve Bloom Mountains and the 543rd-highest summit in Ireland. It is the second-highest mountain in Laois after Arderin, which is also in County Offaly, making Baunreaghcong the highest mountain fully in Laois.

See also
List of mountains in Ireland
Geography of Ireland

References

Mountains and hills of County Laois
Geography of County Laois